Tommy Evans is an Irish cyclist. He won the Rás Tailteann in 1996.

References

Living people
Irish male cyclists
Rás Tailteann winners
Year of birth missing (living people)